Micromax (Scott Wright) is a fictional character, a mutant superhero appearing in American comic books published by Marvel Comics.

Publication history

Micromax was created by Alan Davis and first appeared in Excalibur #44 (Dec. 1991).

Fictional character biography
Prior to the discovery of his mutant abilities, Scott Wright was a disk jockey. With the discovery of his powers he became a special British government operative for M.I.6, a secret British national security unit, under the name Micromax.

He is first seen mistaking Rachel Summers for a burglar, and mistakenly trying to arrest her for robbery. He is later backup for a disastrous mission with his superior officer Brigadier Theobold Blott, several psychics and a team of F.I.6 'Mediators'. They are assigned to track down the perpetrator of the previous thefts and initially erroneously accuse Nightcrawler of sabotage. After that mishap, they are overpowered by a servant creature of Necrom, a powerful sorcerer. They later encounter Necrom himself, and Micromax is the only one to survive the mission, due to his shrinking abilities. He unsuccessfully attempts to kill Necrom. Necrom comes away with the impression Micromax has very little viable life force. Micromax is later mind-controlled by Brain Drain in an attempt to assassinate the British Prime Minister, but this is thwarted by Aurora. Micromax later helps Excalibur members Kylun and Feron battle Necrom, using his powers to grow to a massive size and crush Necrom, stunning him temporarily and allowing the other heroes to mount an offense.

Micromax participates in battling the threat from the politician Orpington Smythe. Smythe is using manipulation, torture and murder in an attempt to control all the governmental agencies that deal with super-powered happenings. Micromax is captured for Nigel Orpington-Smythe by the R.C.X. He is subjected to medical tests at the Cloud Nine facility. Excalibur and a mutiny from within Smythe's own ranks eventually end Smythe's threat.

After a few missions with Excalibur, he resigns from the F.I.6 to join the Brand Corporation in New Jersey. He uses his super-hero identity from time to time, and even helps the Avengers face the invasion of Kang the Conqueror.

He becomes involved in a battle with X-Force and the surviving original X-Men over the fate of the '198', a group of mutants being forcibly detained on the grounds of the X-Mansion. At the request of the British government Micromax joins O*N*E*, a policing force against unruly mutants. This team is fronted by Bishop with the support of Sabra. During the fight he is stabbed in the chest by Shatterstar, and the 198 escape. He receives medical attention and survives the attack.

Micromax has also been shown to be working with a group of vigilantes, called the Vanguard.

Powers and abilities
Micromax has the ability to increase, decrease, or redistribute his body mass, allowing for dramatic size and shape changes. He can shrink to roughly half an inch or grow to 65 feet in height. In everyday life, he uses these powers to become taller, robust, and give himself a full head of hair rather than his short, pot-bellied, but balding appearance. Micromax is a good unarmed combatant and had been trained by the F.I.6.

Reception
 In 2014, Entertainment Weekly ranked Micromax 80th in their "Let's rank every X-Man ever" list.

Other versions
In the 2005 storyline "House of M", Micromax is a member of the Red Guard and was seen assisting them in their fight against the Hood's Masters of Evil in the House of M reality.

In the Ultimate Marvel universe, Micromax is featured as a former mutant prisoner of Camp: Angel and joined Kitty Pryde's resistance in the Ultimate Marvel title, Ultimate Comics: X-Men.

References

External links
 Micromax at Marvel.com

Characters created by Alan Davis
Comics characters introduced in 1991
Excalibur (comics)
Fictional characters who can change size
Fictional characters with superhuman durability or invulnerability
Fictional DJs
Marvel Comics characters who are shapeshifters
Marvel Comics characters with superhuman strength
Marvel Comics mutants
Marvel Comics superheroes